Foulston is a Welsh surname. Notable people with the surname include:

John Foulston (1772–1841), English architect
Jay Foulston (born 2000), Welsh footballer

Welsh-language surnames